Global Viral (GV), previously known as Global Viral Forecasting Institute (GVFI), is a 501(c)(3) not-for-profit organization founded in 2007 by Nathan Wolfe to study infectious diseases, their transmission between animals and humans, and the risk involved with their global spread. An original goal of the organization was to develop an early warning system for pandemics and at one point Global Viral coordinated a staff of over 100 scientists in China, Cameroon, Equatorial Guinea, DR Congo, Republic of the Congo, Laos, Gabon, Central African Republic, Malaysia,  Madagascar and Sao Tome.

However, as of 2019 the organization has "shifted" these areas of research to Metabiota, an independent for-profit company that focuses on risk analysis of pandemics. GV appears to have "now focuse[d] its research on studying the diversity, ecology and evolution of microbes".

References

Infectious diseases
Non-profit organizations based in San Francisco
2007 establishments in California